Tim Hope is a British director, performer and animator best known for his pop videos for Coldplay, R.E.M., Bingo Players and Captain Ango Pango, and his short film The Wolfman.   His pop video for the Coldplay song "Trouble" won him an MTV Video Music Award for Best Art Direction in 2002.  Combining live action and animation, he has created a unique body of work.

Biography
After completing a theology and philosophy degree, Tim Hope became a standup comedian, most notably as one half of the comedy techno band The Pod with comedian Julian Barratt.  Although Hope continues to work in comedy it is his animation work that earned him most attention, beginning with his multi-prize-winning manic short The Wolfman (British Animation Awards 2000: Public Choice and Best Animation at the Cutting Edge).

Since then, Hope has directed videos for Coldplay, Bingo Players, R.E.M., 1 Giant Leap, Jimmy Eat World, King Biscuit Time, Johnny Rzeznik, Robbie Williams, Thrice, and Steve Mason. He has also directed TV commercials for Compare the Market, Sony PlayStation, Comcast and Hewlett Packard. His short films include The Wolfman, Minema Cinema and The Savage Canvas.  He is represented by Passion Pictures.

Along with Andrew Bone, Tim Hope is the writer, performer and producer of The Tired Parents  currently available from Mumsnet.

References

External links
 Bingo Players ft Far East Movement “Get Up" (Director’s Cut)
 Comcast “Moving Room”
 Compare the Market "Sick Sergei"
 Sony PlayStation
 The Wolfman
 Coldplay "Trouble"
 Minema Cinema "Keep Going"
 Captain Ango Pango "If I Were A Woman"
 Passion Pictures: Tim Hope

Year of birth missing (living people)
British animators
British animated film directors
British television directors
English music video directors
Living people